Mariamman temple Kampung Sungai Bakau, also known as Arulmigu Sri Maha Mariamman Aalayam is situated in a village known as Kampung Sungai Bakau, Rawang, Selangor, Malaysia. Founded in 1907 by a person called Late Kanniammah, it was a small hut and was maintained by the Sungai Bakau villagers. Not long after, this temple was built in wood and religious activity continued to be undertaken for the benefit of the residents of Sungai Bakau. This temple is also directly led by several leaders in Sungai Bakau, and through specific development, in 1989, this temple was visited by the then Malaysian Indian Congress President Datuk Seri S. Samy Velu who also contributed RM 5000 to fund the development of this temple. In 1989 also posted the history of this temple for the ceremony of Khumbhabisegam. Currently the temple is headed by Mr. Manimaran.

References

Gombak District
Religious buildings and structures in Selangor